The 2016–17 Liga Meo Azores is fourth edition of the Azorean Football Championship. 10 teams from 5of the 9 islands took part on the competition. Sp. Guadalupe won the title.

Teams 

For the 2016–2017 season:

Standings

Regular phase

Championship zone

Relegation Zone

Barreiro and Os Marítimos relegated to Angra do Heroísmo FA championship
Cedrense relegated to Horta FA championship

References

2016 in Portuguese sport
2017 in Portuguese sport
Football in the Azores